Mill Thozhilali is a 1991 Indian Tamil-language film,  directed by A. Jagannathan and produced by Vijayamurali. The film stars Ramarajan, Aishwarya, Chandrasekhar and Sulakshana.

Cast
Ramarajan as Balu
Aishwarya
Chandrasekhar as Pazhanisamy
Sulakshana
Livingston as Prakash
Jaishankar
Senthil
Kovai Sarala
Kumarimuthu
A. V. Ramanan in a Friendly Appearance
Oru Viral Krishna Rao

Soundtrack
Music: Deva. Lyrics: Kalidasan.

  "Kaalam Ini Maari Vidum..." - K. S. Chithra, Malaysia Vasudevan
  "Kalam Varum Kalam..." - Malaysia Vasudevan
  "Kalyana Solai Kuyile..." - K. J. Yesudas, Uma Ramanan
  "Noorandu Kaalam..." - Mano
  "Vaadi En Annakiliye..." - Malaysia Vasudevan

References

External links
 

1991 films
Films scored by Deva (composer)
1990s Tamil-language films
Films directed by A. Jagannathan